Cordula Wöhler, later Cordula Schmid, pseudonym Cordula Peregrina (17 June 1845 – 6 February 1916) was a German author of Christian literature and hymns, whose "Segne du, Maria" is among the most popular Marian hymns in German-speaking countries. She had written the poem when she, the daughter of a Lutheran pastor, converted to Catholicism. Expelled from home in northern Germany, she moved to Austria and became a recognised author of Christian literature.

Life 
When she was born, her father, a Lutheran theologian, was head of a school in Malchin. Her mother was the daughter of a merchant from Stralsund. Impressed by the sculpture, she developed Marian devotions. She began a correspondence with Catholic authors including Christoph von Schmid and Alban Stolz. In August 1864, she travelled with her family in Thuringia, Bavaria, Tyrol and Switzerland. In Thuringia, she first experienced a Catholic service which impressed her deeply. After intense correspondence with Stolz, and another vacation with her parents in southern Germany in 1868, she decided to convert to the Catholic faith. When her parents became aware of it in March 1869, they objected. In 1870, Wöhler declared that she was, aged 25, independent and determined to convert. Her parents expelled her from the family home.

Coping with her personal experience, she wrote a prayer hymn to Mary on 31 May 1870, "Segne du, Maria, segne mich, dein Kind" ("You, Mary, bless me, your child"). Much later, Karl Kindsmüller (1876–1955), a teacher, church musician and composer of several sacred songs from Lower Bavaria, wrote a melody for it.

On 10 July 1870, Wöhler became a member of the Catholic Church in Freiburg im Breisgau. She made a confession of faith to the bishop Lothar von Kübel, and received confirmation three days later, and her first communion on 16 July 1870. She lived in Tyrol from March 1871 where Lukas Tolpeit, the Pfarrkurat of Eben am Achensee, had offered her a job.  She wrote poems and religious essays. She then moved to Schwaz, where she worked in a pastry shop. After five months, she moved to live with a young couple on the nearby Freundsberg, where she wrote a book, Was das Ewige Licht erzählt. Gedichte über das allerheiligste Altarsakrament (What Eternal Light tells. Poems about the most holy sacrament). It appeared in 25 editions and established her recognition. She published more religious prose and poetry, some under the pseudonym Cordula Peregrina.

In 1876, Josef Anton Schmid from Oberstaufen requested a "pious poem" ("frommes Gedicht") from her for a memorial plaque for the Jesuit Jakob Rem. Schmid and Wöhler entered an intense correspondence, resulting in an engagement before they had met in person. They married in Riezlern, Kleinwalsertal, and moved to Bregenz. She kept publishing under her maiden name. The couple moved to Schwaz in 1881, where they bought a house and adopted two orphan girls. She kept writing, and was active in the local parish together with her husband. The relation to her birth family improved to letters and occasional visits of her parents and her sister in Schwaz, but she never returned home.

She died in Schwaz, and was buried with her husband, who died a few months later, next to the parish church. According to the epitaph, she was a recipient of the Pro Ecclesia et Pontifice cross.

Notes

References

Further reading 

 
 Julius Mayer (ed.), Alban Stolz: "Fügung und Führung", Konvertitenbilder, Part 3, "Alban Stolz und Cordula Wöhler", Freiburg im Breisgau, 1917

 Wieland Vogel: Doch meine Seele habt ihr nicht. Die Konversion der Dichterin Cordula Wöhler. Christiana-Verlag im Fe-Medienverlag, Kisslegg 2020

External links 

 
 Gedichte von Cordula Wöhler (in German) gedichte.xbib.de
 Segne du, Maria, segne mich, dein Kind (in German) st-antonius.at Bregenz 1 May 2008

German Roman Catholic hymnwriters
People from Schwaz
1845 births
1916 deaths
Converts to Roman Catholicism from Lutheranism